Adria Santana (29 August 1948 – 30 September 2011) was a Cuban actress best known for her work in the theater.

Biography
Trained at the National School of Art, Adria Santana soon joined Havana's Teatro Estudio company, where she remained for twenty years. She worked with the directors Héctor Quintero, Armando Suárez del Villar, Berta Martínez, and Jorge Alí Triana. Her best-known roles were Medea, Bernarda in The House of Bernarda Alba, Lalita in Contigo, pan y cebolla, Camila in Santa Camila de La Habana Vieja, the Cuban play Vagos rumores (in which Santana considered that she "developed as an actress"), and especially, her work with Abelardo Estorino. On the occasion of her death, Estorino said:

In the cinema she worked, among others, on the films Polvo Rojo (1982), Wild Dogs (1985), Isla Negra (1995), and Casa Vieja (2010).

She worked at the Teatro Repertorio Español in New York, where she won a Latin ACE Award (1997) and the Best Actress award of the International Monologue Festival of Miami (2001). Among her distinctions in Cuba were the Omar Valdés Award from the National Union of Writers and Artists and the Alejo Carpentier Medal from the Council of State. Adria Santana died to cancer in 2011 at age 63.

References

External links
 

1948 births
2011 deaths
20th-century Cuban actresses
21st-century Cuban actresses
Cuban film actresses
Cuban stage actresses
People from Las Tunas (city)